Billy Ray Skelton (born January 21, 1933), known as B. R. Skelton, is a former Republican member of the South Carolina House of Representatives. He represented the 3rd District from 2002 to 2014. He is a retired professor of economics at Clemson University Skelton is also an alumnus of Clemson, receiving his B.S. and M.S. there in 1956 and 1958 respectively. He received his Ph.D at Duke University in 1964. Prior to his election to the South Carolina House, he served on various committees and commissions for Pickens County. He also worked as a residential contractor,  and real estate broker

References

External links
Project Vote Smart - Rep. B.R. Skelton's profile

1933 births
Living people
Republican Party members of the South Carolina House of Representatives
People from Westminster, South Carolina
People from Six Mile, South Carolina